USS Lapwing may refer to the following ships of the United States Navy:

  was laid down 25 October 1917 by Todd Shipyard Co., New York
  was laid down as YMS-268 on 1 December 1942 by Kruse & Banks Shipbuilding Co., North Bend, Oregon

United States Navy ship names